The 2015 Girls' EuroHockey Youth Championships was the 8th edition of the Girls' EuroHockey Youth Championship. The tournament was held from 19 to 25 July 2015 in Santander, Spain at the Ruth Beitia Municipal Sports Complex.

Netherlands won the tournament for the sixth time after defeating Germany 6–1 in the final.

Qualified teams
The following teams participated in the 2015 EuroHockey Youth Championship:

Format
The eight teams were split into two groups of four teams. The top two teams advanced to the semifinals to determine the winner in a knockout system. The bottom two teams played in a new group with the teams they did not play against in the group stage. The last two teams were relegated to the EuroHockey Youth Championship II.

Results

Preliminary round

Pool A

Pool B

Classification round

Fifth to eighth place classification

Pool C

First to fourth place classification

Semi-finals

Third and fourth place

Final

Statistics

Awards

Final standings

Goalscorers

References

Girls' EuroHockey Youth Championships
Youth
EuroHockey Youth Championships
EuroHockey Youth Championships
EuroHockey Youth Championships
International women's field hockey competitions hosted by Spain
Sport in Santander, Spain
EuroHockey Youth Championships